Cody Mauch (born January 15, 1999) is an American football offensive tackle for the North Dakota State Bison.

Early life and high school
Mauch was born on January 15, 1999, in Breckenridge, Minnesota. His parents live in Mantador, North Dakota, where he attended Hankinson High School and played basketball and football. He finished his high school career with 1,072 receiving yards and scored a school-record 24 touchdowns. In his senior season, Mauch had 24 catches for 474 yards and 13 touchdowns, rushed for 398 yards and four touchdowns, passed for 273 yards and four touchdowns and also had 18.5 sacks on defense in nine games. He was also named second team All-State in basketball as a senior after averaging 20 points, 15.3 rebounds, 3.2 assists, 2.5 steals, and 1.8 blocks per game. Mauch committed to play college football at North Dakota State and join the team as a preferred walk-on over a similar offer from the University of North Dakota and a scholarship offer from Division II Minnesota State–Moorhead.

College career
Mauch redshirted his true freshman season at North Dakota State (NDSU) and was eventually moved from tight end to the offensive line. He played in six games as a redshirt freshman as NDSU won the 2018 FCS national championship. Mauch played in all 16 of the Bison's games during his redshirt sophomore season, appearing on special teams and also lining up at tight end in some formations to function as a sixth offensive lineman while the team repeated as national champions.

Mauch became a starter in the second game of his redshirt junior season, which was shortened and played in the spring of 2021 due to the COVID-19 pandemic in the United States. He was named second-team All-Missouri Valley Football Conference (MVFC). He was named first-team All-MVFC and a second-team All-American by the Associated Press after starting all 15 of NDSU's games as the Bison again won the FCS national title. Mauch decided to utilize the extra year of eligibility granted to college athletes who played in the 2020 season due to the coronavirus pandemic and return to NDSU for a sixth season. He was added to the watchlist for the 2022 Walter Payton Award midway through the season.

References

External links
North Dakota State Bison bio

Living people
American football offensive tackles
Players of American football from North Dakota
North Dakota State Bison football players
1999 births